The Phillips School of Nursing at Mount Sinai Beth Israel (PSON) is the school of nursing at the Mount Sinai Health System in New York City.

History
Originally named Beth Israel School of Nursing, the school was founded in 1902 to train nurses for the nascent Beth Israel Hospital (now Mount Sinai Beth Israel). Very quickly, the demand for services at Beth Israel Hospital grew and the recruitment of nurses rapidly became a necessity. The school's foundation reflected a historical national movement in nursing: that nurses in “training” also provided “service” at the hospital. Soon thereafter, in 1904, the school was chartered by the New York Board of Regents as an educational institution.

Beth Israel —Hebrew for "House of Israel"— was founded on May 28, 1890. At a time when most of the city's hospitals would not treat patients who had been in the city less than a year, 40 immigrant Orthodox Jews on the Lower East Side of Manhattan each paid 25 cents to open a small clinic and emergency room at 206 Broadway. After decades of expansions and acquisitions, in 2013 Beth Israel Medical Center joined the Mount Sinai Health System, and its name was changed to Mount Sinai Beth Israel. Since then, Phillips School of Nursing at Mount Sinai Beth Israel has been Mount Sinai's sole nursing school.

Academics
The school offers a 15-month Accelerated Bachelor of Science in Nursing program (ABSN) for second-degree students and a 15-month Bachelor of Science Completion Program (RN-BS) for registered nurses. Both programs are accredited by the Commission on Collegiate Nursing Education. The school's Center for Continuing Education offers a variety of courses open to all nurses for CE credit as well as for professional development. Graduate degree programs are being developed as part of the school's strategic plan. The Dean of the school is Dr. Todd F. Ambrosia, who replaced Dr. Janet Mackin in 2015.

Facility
In the Fall of 2020, the school moved to its newly-built location on 148 East 126th Street (between Lexington and Third Avenues), closer to the Mount Sinai Hospital and the Icahn School of Medicine. Designed by acclaimed Danish architect Bjarke Ingels, the 35,000 square facility will include a multi-purpose Auditorium and a state-of-the-art Simulation Center with hospital inpatient, primary care, home care, and operating room settings.

References

External links

Nursing schools in New York City
Educational institutions established in 1902
1902 establishments in New York City
Private universities and colleges in New York City